A by-election was held for the Australian House of Representatives seat of Newcastle on 1 June 1935. This was triggered by the death of long-serving Labor MP David Watkins. Following Watkins' death, only Billy Hughes and Senator George Pearce remained of those elected at the first federal election in 1901.

The by-election was won by Watkins' son, David Oliver Watkins. As Newcastle was the only remaining New South Wales seat held by the federal Labor Party, the by-election was closely fought with the breakaway New South Wales Labor Party, supporters of the controversial former Premier Jack Lang.

Results

David Watkins Sr. died. The by-election was won by Watkins' son, David Oliver Watkins.

References

1935 elections in Australia
New South Wales federal by-elections